{{Automatic_taxobox
| image =
| image_caption = 
| display_parents = 2
| taxon = Anoamyia
| authority = Lindner, 1935
| type_species = Anoamyia heinrichiana'
| type_species_authority = Lindner, 1935
| synonyms = 
}}Anoamyia is a genus of flies in the family Stratiomyidae.

SpeciesAnoamyia heinrichiana Lindner, 1935Anoamyia javana James, 1936Anoamyia rectispina'' Yang, Zhang & Li, 2014

References

Stratiomyidae
Brachycera genera
Taxa named by Erwin Lindner
Diptera of Asia